The Succession to the Crown Act 1707 (6 Ann c 41) is an Act of Parliament of the Parliament of Great Britain. It is still partly in force in Great Britain.

The Act was passed at a time when Parliament was anxious to ensure the succession of a Protestant on the death of Queen Anne. It replaced the Regency Act 1705. The Act required privy counsellors and other officers, in the event of Anne's death, to proclaim as her successor the next Protestant in the line of succession to the throne, and made it high treason for any of them to fail to do so.

If the next monarch was overseas at the time of the succession, the government would be run until he or she returned by between seven and fourteen "Lords Justices." Seven of the Lords Justices were named in the Act, and the next monarch could appoint seven more, who would be named in writing, three copies of which were to be sent to the Privy Council in England. The Act made it treason for any unauthorised person to open these, or to neglect to deliver them to the Privy Council. The Lords Justices were to have the power to give royal assent to bills, except that they would be guilty of treason if they amended the Act of Uniformity 1662 or the Protestant Religion and Presbyterian Church Act 1707.

The Act also provided that if Parliament was sitting at the time of the monarch's death, then it would be able to sit for a further six months unless dissolved by a new legitimate monarch. Previously the death of the monarch automatically dissolved Parliament. If the monarch were to die and Parliament was not at that time sitting, then it would immediately convene. These clauses remain in force today (without the six-month time limit on Parliament's continued existence, which was repealed in 1878).

The Act also made it treason maliciously, advisedly and directly by writing or printing to maintain and affirm that any person has a right to the Crown otherwise than according to the Act of Settlement and Acts of Union, or that the Crown and Parliament cannot pass statutes for the limitation of the succession to the Crown. It was praemunire to say so in speech. These provisions were extended to Scotland by the Treason Act 1708, and were repealed in 1967 (however see the Treason Act 1702 which makes similar provision).

Anne died on 1 August 1714 and was succeeded as a result of the Act of Settlement 1701 by the Elector of Hanover, George Louis, as King George I, who arrived in Great Britain on 18 September 1714.

Sections 1 to 3 were repealed by the Criminal Law Act 1967. The whole Act was formally repealed in the Republic of Ireland by the Statute Law Revision Act 2007.

This Act is not to be confused with 6 Ann. c.14, which is entitled "An act for the better security of Her Majesty's person and government" but which is not about treason.

See also
 Meeting of Parliament Act 1797
 Prorogation Act 1867
 High treason in the United Kingdom
 Treason Act

References

External links
 Text of the Demise of the Crown Act 1727, which clarified the 1707 Act, as in force today (including any amendments) within the United Kingdom, from the UK Statute Law Database.
List of repeals in the Republic of Ireland from the Irish Statute Book

Great Britain Acts of Parliament 1707
Succession to the British crown
Treason in the United Kingdom
Protestantism in the United Kingdom
Anti-Catholicism in the United Kingdom
Succession acts